Frederick Herring Hastings (December 2, 1818 – October 15, 1869) was an American lawyer, manufacturer, and politician from New York.

Life 
Hastings was born on December 2, 1818 in Albany, New York.

Hastings graduated from Williams College in 1838, after which he practiced law in Albany. In 1848, circumstances compelled him to leave the profession and he became a manufacturer of cotton goods in Brainard.

In 1863, Hastings was elected to the New York State Senate as a Republican, representing New York's 12th State Senate district (Rensselaer and Washington counties). He served in the Senate in 1864 and 1865. During the last year of his term, his health began to fail him and he lost the renomination. He also served for a term or two as town supervisor of Nassau.

Hastings was an active member and elder of the Brainard Presbyterian Church. He was married three times: first to Frances F. Hosmer in 1842, then to Lavinia C. King in 1855, then to Loraine E. King in 1863.

Hastings died at home on October 15, 1869. He was buried in Albany Rural Cemetery in Menands.

References

External links 

 The Political Graveyard
 Frederick H. Hastings at Find a Grave

1818 births
1869 deaths
Lawyers from Albany, New York
Politicians from Albany, New York
Williams College alumni
19th-century American lawyers
People from Rensselaer County, New York
American manufacturing businesspeople
19th-century American politicians
Town supervisors in New York (state)
Republican Party New York (state) state senators
Presbyterians from New York (state)
Burials at Albany Rural Cemetery